The jaguarundi (Herpailurus yagouaroundi;  or ) is a wild cat native to the Americas. Its range extends from central Argentina in the south to northern Mexico, through Central and South America east of the Andes. The jaguarundi is a medium-sized cat of slender build. Its coloration is uniform with two color morphs, gray and red. It has an elongated body, with relatively short legs, a small, narrow head, small, round ears, a short snout, and a long tail, resembling mustelids in these respects.

Secretive and alert, the jaguarundi is typically solitary or forms pairs in the wild, though captive individuals are more gregarious. Unlike other sympatric cats such as the ocelot, the jaguarundi is more active during the day and hunts mainly during daytime and evening hours. Individuals live in large home ranges, and are sparsely distributed within a region. The jaguarundi is an efficient climber, but typically prefers hunting on ground. It feeds on various kinds of prey, especially ground-feeding birds, reptiles, rodents and small mammals. Mating occurs throughout the year, with peaks at different times of the year across the range. After a gestation period of 70 to 75 days, a litter of one to four kittens is born. Lifespans of up to 15 years have been recorded in captivity.

The jaguarundi inhabits a broad array of closed as well as open habitats ranging from tropical rainforests and deciduous forests to deserts and thorn scrubs. It is fairly common in Brazil, Peru, and Venezuela, but may be locally extinct in the United States. It is listed as Least Concern on the IUCN Red List, but populations are in decline in many parts of its range due to loss and fragmentation of habitat and persecution for killing poultry.

Etymology
The common name "jaguarundi" comes from the Old Guarani word yaguarundi, similar to the Old Tupi word yawaum'di, meaning "dark jaguar". In some Spanish-speaking countries, the jaguarundi is also called gato colorado, gato moro, león brenero, leoncillo and tigrillo. It is also called eyra, gato-mourisco, gato-preto, gato-vermelho and maracajá-preto in Brazilian Portuguese.

Taxonomy
In 1803 Étienne Geoffroy Saint-Hilaire described two jaguarundi skins and skulls from unknown locations in Central America and proposed the scientific name Felis yagouarundi. In the 19th and 20th centuries, several more zoological specimens were described:
Felis eyra proposed by Gotthelf Fischer von Waldheim in 1814 was a ferruginous skin from Paraguay.
F. cacomitli proposed by Jean-Louis Berlandier in 1859 was a skull and a grayish skin of a female jaguarundi from the Rio Grande area in Mexico.
F. yagouaroundi tolteca proposed by Oldfield Thomas in 1898 was a skull and a reddish skin from Sinaloa in Mexico.
F. Ameghinoi proposed by Eduardo Ladislao Holmberg in 1898 for fossil cat bones, presumably of a jaguarundi, that were excavated near San Luis, Argentina.
F. fossata by Edgar Alexander Mearns in 1901 was a large jaguarundi skull from Yucatán.
F. panamensis by Joel Asaph Allen in 1904 was a dusky gray skin of a young adult female jaguarundi collected in Panama's Chiriquí Province.
F. yagouaroundi melantho by Oldfield Thomas in 1914 were skulls and blackish brown skins of a male and a female from Pozuzo District in Peru.

The generic name Herpailurus was proposed by Nikolai Severtzov in 1858 for the jaguarundi. Later authors classified the jaguarundi in the genus Puma along with the cougar (P. concolor). Phylogeographical analysis of jaguarundi samples from across its range found no genetic evidence for subspecies. In 2017, the IUCN Cat Specialist Group revised felid taxonomy and recognises the jaguarundi as a monotypic taxon of the genus Herpailurus.

Phylogeny and evolution

The jaguarundi is most closely related to the cougar; the jaguarundi-cougar clade is sister to the cheetah. These three species comprise the Puma lineage, one of the eight lineages of Felidae; the Puma lineage diverged from the rest . The sister group of the Puma lineage is a clade of smaller Old World cats that includes the genera Felis, Otocolobus and Prionailurus.

Acinonyx possibly diverged from the lineage in the Americas; some authors alternatively suggest that the cheetah diverged in the Old World.

The Puma lineage appears to have migrated from Asia to North America after crossing the Bering Strait, arriving in South America via the Isthmus of Panama by the Late Pliocene or Early Pleistocene. The original North American cougars were extirpated during the Pleistocene extinctions around 10,000 years ago; North America was then recolonized by South American cougars and jaguarundis 10,000–8,000 years ago. The extinct North American genus Miracinonyx is another member of this clade.

Characteristics

The jaguarundi is a medium-sized cat of slender build and uniform coloration that differs significantly from other neotropical cats — such as the small, spotted cats in the genus Leopardus — in its external appearance. This has been attributed to variations in its karyotype — the jaguarundi has 38 chromosomes, unlike the 36 in other small South American cats, and the chromosomal features resemble those of Old World cats such as the leopard cat (Prionailurus bengalensis). In fact, the jaguarundi shows several features seen in mustelids such as otters and weasels — it has an elongated body with relatively short legs, a small, narrow head, small, round ears, a short snout and a long tail. Males are slightly larger than females.

The coat is uniformly colored with at most a few faint markings on the face and the belly, though kittens are spotted for a short duration. Black and white marks on the lips and the snout, similar to those of the cougar, can be clearly seen in juveniles and some adults. Two color morphs are known (though intermediate shades are also seen) — gray (blackish to brownish-gray fur with a grizzled look due to bright and dark rings on individual hairs) and red (foxy red to chestnut); earlier these morphs were considered two different species. Individuals of both colors can be born in the same litter. Blackish brown individuals superficially resemble the tayra (Eira barbara), but the latter can be told apart by the clear, yellowish patch on the throat. The red morph is seen more often in dry, open areas. Melanistic individuals have been reported, but the coat is not completely black; the head and the throat are clearly paler than the rest of the body.

Among felids, the jaguarundi is closely similar to the flat-headed cat (Prionailurus planiceps), but has a longer body and proportionately longer legs, is heavier and lacks the dark markings on the cheeks of the flat-headed cat. Tawny jaguarundis bear a similar coloration as the significantly larger cougar.

The diploid number of chromosomes in jaguarundi is 2n=38.

Distribution and habitat
The jaguarundi inhabits a wide variety of habitats, from tropical rainforests and deciduous forests to deserts and thorn scrubs. It can also be found in cloud forests, mangroves and savannas. Unlike the sympatric margay, ocelot and oncilla, the jaguarundi can live in open areas as well. In open habitats the jaguarundi prefers areas with vegetative cover such as cacti, which would generally be difficult for potential predators to penetrate; there may be a few clearings at the periphery of such areas. Jaguarundis tend to stay close to a source of running water. The jaguarundi is noted for its resistance to environmental disturbances in its habitat; it can thrive in reforested areas.

The range extends from central Argentina in the south to northern Mexico, through Central and South America east of the Andes — second only to the cougar in the latitudinal extent of its distribution. However, not all parts of its range have been studied well. The jaguarundi is fairly common in Brazil, Peru, and Venezuela. It is possibly extirpated in the US; a 1999 study refuted claims of sightings in Arizona. The last confirmed sighting in the US was probably of a roadkilled individual near Brownsville, Texas in 1986.

The occurrence of the jaguarundi in Florida has remained in doubt for decades, where they have been reported since 1907. They were allegedly introduced in the region by a writer from Chiefland who at some point imported the animals from their native habitat and released them near his hometown and in other locations across the state. W. T. Neill noted that jaguarundis occurred throughout peninsular Florida in the 1950s, but the numbers had plummeted by the late 1970s. Jaguarundis were also reported in the coastal area of Alabama in the 1980s, which may be evidence of the Florida population migrating northward. The jaguarundi has also been recorded from Cerro Largo in Uruguay, where its presence was uncertain.

Behavior and ecology

The jaguarundi is shy and reclusive, and apparently very cautious of traps. There have been only a few radio telemetry studies of jaguarundis in Belize, Brazil and Mexico. Though activity has been observed throughout the day and at night, jaguarundis seem to prefer hunting during daytime and evening hours; for instance, a study in Belize reported that jaguarundis started moving before dawn and remained active through most of the day till sunset with a peak in hunting from late morning to noon. The cat appears to be more diurnal than most other cats, especially spotted cats that tend to be more active at night. The jaguarundi can swim across medium-sized rivers; one in Bolivia was recorded swimming across the Tuichi River. Jaguarundis are efficient climbers as well, but hunt mainly on ground; the coat color works as a good camouflage for terrestrial activity. They can leap up to  into the air to catch birds. Predators recorded for jaguarundis include boa constrictors, cougars and domestic dogs. Parasites such as hookworms (Ancylostoma species), tapeworms (such as  Spirometra and Toxocara species) and the lung fluke have been found in jaguarundis.

Studies have mostly observed jaguarundis alone or in pairs; pairs could probably be formed between mothers and older kittens or between individuals of opposite sexes during the mating season. Individuals in captivity have been found to be more gregarious. Home ranges tend to be large; a study in Brazil recorded home ranges  in size for females, while those of males measured  in area.

Marking behavior could serve as a means of olfactory or visual communication among jaguarundis; individuals in captivity have been observed scraping areas with their hind feet (sometimes with urination), clawing on logs, rubbing objects with their heads and leaving feces uncovered. Social behavior such as grooming, growling and sniffing has been recorded. The jaguarundi has a broad vocal repertoire; 13 different calls have been recorded including chattering, purring, screaming, a 'wah-wah' call, whistling, yapping and a peculiar bird-like chirp. In captivity, females in estrus have been observed making faint sounds as they scent mark the area around their enclosures.

Diet

Jaguarundis will also take larger prey such as domestic poultry, fish, marmosets, rabbits and opossums; a study recorded small deer (possibly carrion) in the diet. Vegetation such as grasses have also been recorded in their diet. A study showed jaguarundis take  vertebrate prey on an average every day. The broad array of prey recorded for the jaguarundi across its range and varying proportions of different prey in its diet could indicate that the cat tends to feed on the most abundant and easily catchable prey in the area.

Reproduction
Jaguarundis have been observed mating all year round, with peaks at different times of the year across the range; for instance, in Mexico breeding peaks in January and March. Estrus lasts three to five days, marked by the female regularly rolling onto her back and spraying urine. Sexually mature males will pursue the female, not reacting to any aggressive behavior from her side. As in many other felids, the male bites the fur on the female's neck on mounting; the female lets out a loud scream on penetration.

After a gestation period of 70 to 75 days, a litter of one to four kittens is born in a den constructed in a dense thicket, hollow tree, or similar cover. The kittens are covered well with fur and the underside is marked with spots, which disappear as they age; the coat color gradually changes as the kittens grow older. The mother starts bringing solid food for the kittens when they are around three weeks old, but they simply play with it until the mother ultimately ingests it. Kittens are capable of taking solid food like birds and guinea pigs at around six weeks. Jaguarundis become sexually mature at one to three years of age. Lifespan up to 15 years has been recorded in captivity.

Threats and conservation

The jaguarundi has been listed as Least Concern on the IUCN Red List since 2002. Mexican populations, except those in the northeast, appear to be stable. The huge protected areas in the Amazon Basin are probably the only conservation units that can sustain long-term viable populations. IUCN Red List assessors noted that it should be listed as Near Threatened, but the data were not sufficient to extend this classification throughout the jaguarundi's range. The jaguarundi is not particularly sought after for its fur due to its poor quality and low value, but it is suffering decline due to habitat loss. 

Other threats include risks of habitat fragmentation and persecution for killing poultry. The North and Central American jaguarundi populations are listed in CITES Appendix I and all the other populations are listed in CITES Appendix II. Populations in the US are protected under the Endangered Species Act; the Texas Parks and Wildlife Department has expressed concern that its presence in South Texas may be imperiled due to loss of the cat's native habitat. Populations in Mexico are listed under the Mexican Official Norm NOM-059-SEMARNAT-2010. 

Hunting jaguarundi is restricted in Peru and banned in Argentina, Belize, Brazil, Bolivia, Colombia, Costa Rica, French Guiana, Guatemala, Honduras, Mexico, Panama, Paraguay, Suriname, Uruguay, United States, and Venezuela.

References

Notes

External links 
 
 
 
 

Puma (genus)
Felids of Central America
Felids of North America
Felids of South America
Mammals of Brazil
Mammals of Bolivia
Mammals of Argentina
Mammals of Colombia
Mammals of Ecuador
Mammals of French Guiana
Mammals of Guyana
Mammals of Mexico
Mammals of Suriname
Mammals of Paraguay
Mammals of Peru
Mammals of Venezuela
Fauna of northern South America
Mammals described in 1803